Colin Howell (born 14 March 1959) is a Northern Irish convicted double murderer. The murders and surrounding story were the subject of an ITV drama series The Secret, broadcast in April and May 2016.

Howell killed his wife Lesley (née Clarke) and the husband of his lover, Trevor Buchanan (who was an RUC officer), in what appeared to be a suicide pact between the spouses of two lovers. The bodies were found in a fume-filled car in Castlerock on 19 May 1991. In 1998 Howell confessed the murders to his second wife, but she agreed not to inform the authorities. She was investigated following his arrest, but was not charged.

Howell's ex-brother-in-law has since accused him of murdering Harry Clarke. Howell's father-in-law died only 11 days before Lesley.

After murdering his wife, Howell received a payout of £400,000. He later lost £350,000 in a get-rich-quick scheme which had claimed to find Yamashita's gold in the Philippines. Howell had been led to believe he would make £20 million; however he only acquired a few brass ammunition boxes, containing silver coins, worth about £30. Howell initially invested £100,000 but, over six months, steadily invested more after being told that the gold was buried under booby-trapped tunnels. He sold his shares in two dental practices and attempted to persuade friends to invest.

He believed that this, and the death of his son, were punishments from God.

Howell, a native of Portadown and a dentist by occupation, was a deeply religious father of nine and a former lay preacher. He married Lesley in July 1983 and together they had four children. They were members of the local Baptist church. After his wife's murder, Howell married Kyle Jorgensen, a native of New York, with whom he had five children.

Howell confessed his role in the murders to elders in his church, who urged him to inform police. He pleaded guilty to the murders on 18 November 2010 and was sentenced to life imprisonment. He was told he must serve a minimum 21-year jail term.

His former lover Hazel (née Elkin, formerly married to Trevor Buchanan, currently married to David Stewart) claimed in court that she acted under duress, but was found guilty of the murders of Lesley Howell and Trevor Buchanan in March 2011 and sentenced to life imprisonment with a minimum term of 18 years. The trial judge stated that Hazel Stewart could have prevented Buchanan's death.

Police investigators were later criticised for having overlooked some facts, most notably that the driver's window was open and that Buchanan's leg was hanging out of the open car door; in addition, a witness had told police that Howell had previously tried to murder his wife.

On 17 May 2011 Howell pleaded guilty to sexually assaulting nine female patients in his surgery over a period of several years. He was consequently stripped of his National Health Service pension.

See also
Let This Be Our Secret
The Secret (TV series)

References

1959 births
Living people
British people convicted of murdering police officers
People convicted of murder by Northern Ireland
People from Northern Ireland convicted of indecent assault
People from Northern Ireland convicted of murder
Prisoners from Northern Ireland sentenced to life imprisonment
Prisoners sentenced to life imprisonment by Northern Ireland
People from Portadown